The Tuxedni Group is a geologic group in Alaska. It preserves fossils dating back to the Jurassic period.

See also

 List of fossiliferous stratigraphic units in Alaska
 Paleontology in Alaska

References

 

Geologic groups of Alaska
Jurassic System of North America